Liane Fenwick (born 10 June 1971 in Sydney, Australia) is an Australian beach volleyball player who competed in the women's tournament of the 1996 Summer Olympics alongside Anita Spring.

References

Australian women's beach volleyball players
Beach volleyball players at the 1996 Summer Olympics
Sportspeople from Sydney
1971 births
Olympic beach volleyball players of Australia
Living people
Sportswomen from New South Wales